Scrobipalpa sattleri is a moth in the family Gelechiidae. It was described by Alexandr L. Lvovsky and Vladimir I. Piskunov in 1989. It is found in Turkmenistan, Korea, China (Inner Mongolia) Mongolia.

References

Scrobipalpa
Moths described in 1989